Marc JB (or Marc Jackson Burrows) is a British music producer who was part of the production team that had a number one on the UK Dance Chart with "Thunder in My Heart Again" by Meck featuring Leo Sayer.

He produces in partnership with DJ Lee Dagger and together they have produced and remixed many tracks by other artists, including Kanye West, Britney Spears, Janet Jackson and Yoko Ono. They have many of their remixes cut to the original video on YouTube.

Marc JB, Lee Dagger and house music vocalist Katherine Ellis also form a dance music group called Bimbo Jones. In 2006, the band had a UK hit in 2006 with "Harlem One Stop" reaching number 1 in the UK Dance charts.

Discography

Singles
2006 "Harlem One Stop" (with Bimbo Jones)
2006 "Thunder in My Heart Again" (Meck featuring Leo Sayer)

Remixes

Unstoppable - Goldlock & Octagon
Shake It - The Outhere Brothers
Grace Kelly - Mika
Goodbye - Hi on Life featuring Joniece
Don't Mess with my Man - Booty Luv
What a Feeling - The Hughes Corporation
Fade - Solu Music
Piece of Me - Britney Spears
Float Away - Robbie Rivera
Fascination - Alphabeat
With Love - Hilary Duff
U + Ur Hand - Pink
Who Knew - Pink
In My Arms - Plumb
Take It Like Man - Dragonette
Rainy Monday - Shiny Toy Guns
Band of Gold - Kimberley Locke
Nothin' Better to Do - LeAnn Rimes
Give It All You Got - Ultra Nate featuring Chris Willis
Like a Boy - Ciara
Turn Around - Samantha Jade
Guilty - De Souza featuring Shèna
Where's the Pleasure - Protocol
Superfreak - Beatfreakz
So Excited - Janet Jackson
Sleep - Texas
Industry - The Modern
A Thousand Beautiful Things - Annie Lennox
You and Me - Uniting Nations
This Is My Time - Terri Walker
These Boots Are Made for Walking - Jessica Simpson
Round Round - Bodyrockers
Oh - Ciara
Joy - Staxx
I Wanna Know What Love Is - Systematik
I Said Never Again (But Here We Go Again) - Rachel Stevens
I Like the Way - Bodyrockers
Foolish - Tyler James
Desire - Geri Halliwell
Caught Up - Usher
These Words - Natasha Bedingfield
Goodies - Ciara
The Trouble with Love Is - Kelly Clarkson
Say Something Anyway - Bellefire
Let the Music Take You - Keshia Chanté
Common Ground - Jaimeson
I'll Be There - Emma Bunton
I Like You - DJ Trix
Fresh - Kool & the Gang featuring Liberty X
Everybody Cries - Liberty X
Too Far Gone - Lisa Scott-Lee
Sweet Dreams My L.A. Ex - Rachel Stevens
Sunshine - Gareth Gates
Sundown - S Club 8
Stop Sign - Abs
Passion - Amen! UK
Love Ain't Gonna Wait - S Club
Lately - Lisa Scott-Lee
It's Your Duty - Lene
I Just Wanna Say - Michelle Lawson
Come On Over - Kym Marsh
Without Love - Sun

References

External links
 
 
  (includes links to Discogs entries for all variations and associated groups)
Bimbo Jones official website

Living people
British record producers
Year of birth missing (living people)